Constanza Gabriela Schönhaut Soto (born 31 January 1989) is a Chilean lawyer who was a member of the Chilean Constitutional Convention (2021–2022).

After Chileans rejected the proposed constitution in a plebiscite Schönhaut was invited to work at the Ministry of the Interior and Public Security as coordinator for its links to regional and provincial governments.

She has previously had a relationship with Minister Giorgio Jackson and is known for being close to the President of Chile Gabriel Boric.

References

External links
 

Living people
1989 births
21st-century Chilean lawyers
21st-century Chilean politicians
Members of the Chilean Constitutional Convention
University of Chile alumni
21st-century Chilean women politicians
People from Santiago
Members of the Autonomist Movement
Social Convergence politicians